Dikili Gulf is an Aegean gulf of Turkey.

The gulf is named after the district center Dikili. The midpoint of the gulf is at   
The gulf is mostly in İzmir Province and partly in Balıkesir Province including Sarımsaklı beaches and Altınova of Ayvalık district . The southernmost point of the gulf is Bademli, a coastal village. Edremit Gulf is to the north and Çandarlı Gulf is to the south of Dikili Gulf. The Greek island Lesbos is to the west. Turkish state highway  runs along the Dikili Gulf coastline.

References

Landforms of İzmir Province
Gulfs of Turkey
Dikili District
Gulfs of the Aegean Sea